Just Shoot Me! is an American television sitcom created by Steven Levitan. The series takes place at the fictional Blush magazine headquarters and follows the staff, which includes the magazine's owner and publisher Jack Gallo (George Segal), writer and editor Maya Gallo (Laura San Giacomo), fashion editor and former supermodel Nina Van Horn (Wendie Malick); Elliot DiMauro Enrico Colantoni, the photographer; and Dennis Finch (David Spade), Jack's assistant. Just Shoot Me aired on NBC from March 4, 1997 to November 26, 2003, broadcasting 148 episodes over seven seasons during its initial run. During the series run, the series received 27 award nominations, including 6 Emmy Awards, 7 Golden Globe Awards, and 4 Satellite Awards.

Awards and nominations

BMI Film & TV Awards

Golden Globe Awards

Primetime Emmy Awards

Satellite Awards

Other awards

References

Just Shoot Me